Raymond Tam (born 20 October 1986) is an Australian badminton player and is currently top of the Badminton Australia men's doubles rankings. Tam was born in Hong Kong, and immigrated to Australia with his father when he was 3 years old. He competed for Australia at the 2014 Commonwealth Games. Tam was educated at Newington College (1995–2004) and lives in Sydney. He was the champion at the Oceania Badminton Championships in 2012 in the mixed doubles event, and in 2014 in the men's doubles event.

Achievements

Oceania Championships 
Men's doubles

Mixed doubles

BWF International Challenge/Series (1 title, 5 runners-up) 
Men's doubles

Mixed doubles

  BWF International Challenge tournament
  BWF International Series tournament
  BWF Future Series tournament

References

External links 
 
 
 
 
 

1986 births
Living people
Australian people of Chinese descent
Hong Kong emigrants to Australia
Sportspeople from Sydney
Australian male badminton players
Badminton players at the 2014 Commonwealth Games
Commonwealth Games competitors for Australia
People educated at Newington College
Sportsmen from New South Wales